Lewis Lorando "Randy" McMillan (born December 17, 1958) is a former American football player. McMillan played for Harford Community College, earning All-American junior college honors before transferring to the University of Pittsburgh, and was selected by the Baltimore Colts in the 1st round (12th overall) of the 1981 NFL Draft. McMillan played in six National Football League (NFL) seasons from 1981 to 1986 for his hometown Colts, continuing with the team when owner Bob Irsay moved them to Indianapolis in March 1984.

McMillan's career ended following injuries he received on April 26, 1987. He was struck by a vehicle in Baltimore County, Maryland and received injuries to his leg and spine. The injuries forced him to miss the 1987 NFL season. He spent two weeks with the Miami Dolphins in August 1988, but was released prior to the start of the 1988 NFL season.

External links
 Klingaman, Mike. "Catching Up With...former Colt Randy McMillan," The Toy Department (The Baltimore Sun sports blog), Tuesday, December 8, 2009.

1958 births
Living people
People from Havre de Grace, Maryland
Players of American football from Maryland
American football running backs
Harford Fighting Owls football players
Pittsburgh Panthers football players
Baltimore Colts players
Indianapolis Colts players